William Walter Veach was an American football Halfback who played one season for the Decatur Staleys of the National Football League.

External links
Walter Veach Bio (Staley Museum)

References

1892 births
1976 deaths
American football halfbacks
Decatur Staleys players
Players of American football from Georgia (U.S. state)
Sportspeople from Macon, Georgia